René Berthier (1912–2001) was a French film and television actor.

Partial filmography

 Croisière pour l'inconnu (1948) - Fleuret
 I Like Only You (1949) - Le secrétaire
 Rendezvous in July (1949)
 Not Any Weekend for Our Love (1950) - Le docteur Étoffe
 Old Boys of Saint-Loup (1950) - Lahulotte - l'avocat
 Shadow and Light (1951) - Minor Role (uncredited)
 Boîte à vendre (1951, Short)
 We Are All Murderers (1952) - Un monsieur (uncredited)
 Follow That Man (1953) - Le curé (uncredited)
 Piédalu député (1954)
 Royal Affairs in Versailles (1954) - Le Gall (uncredited)
 Crainquebille (1954) - Dr. Mathieu
 Adam Is Eve (1954) - Le portier
 Service Entrance (1954) - Le docteur
 Interdit de séjour (1955) - Un inspecteur (uncredited)
 Razzia sur la chnouf (1955) - Le docteur (uncredited)
 Men in White (1955) - Un interne
 If Paris Were Told to Us (1956) - Minor rôle (uncredited)
 Elena and Her Men (1956) - (uncredited)
 La roue (1957)
 Fernand clochard (1957) -
 La peau de l'ours (1957) - (uncredited)
 Les Truands (1957) - (uncredited)
 Thérèse Étienne (1958)
 It's All Adam's Fault (1958)
 Le septième ciel (1958) - (uncredited)
 Back to the Wall (1958) - Le prêtre (uncredited)
 Montparnasse 19 (1958) - (uncredited)
 Le désordre et la nuit (1958) - Le réceptionniste du 'George V' (uncredited)
 Mimi Pinson (1958)
 En cas de malheur (1958) - Un journaliste (uncredited)
 Du rififi chez les femmes (1959) - Minor Role
 Green Harvest (1959)
 The President (1961) - Un parlementaire (uncredited)
 Le glaive et la balance (1963) - (uncredited)
 The Restaurant (1966)
 Les risques du métier (1967) - Minor rôle (uncredited)
 À tout casser (1968) - L'associé de Morelli
 Le gendarme se marie (1968) - Berthier, l'adjoint du colonel
 Le Cercle Rouge (1970) - Le directeur de la P.J.
 Le gendarme en balade (1970) - Berthier, l'adjoint du colonel
 Don't Deliver Us from Evil (1971) - Gustave
 Les guichets du Louvre (1974)
 Cookies (1975) - Le V.R.P.
 Oublie-moi, Mandoline (1976)
 Que notre règne arrive (1976)
 Une fille cousue de fil blanc (1977)
 Comme la lune (1977) - Le père Pouplard
 The Gendarme and the Extra-Terrestrials (1977) - Berthier - l'adjoint du colonel
 Le gendarme et les gendarmettes (1982) - Berthier, l'adjoint du colonel (uncredited)

References

Bibliography
 Ginette Vincendeau. Jean-Pierre Melville: An American in Paris.. British Film Institute, 2003.

External links

1912 births
2001 deaths
French male film actors
Male actors from Paris
20th-century French male actors